Where are You, my Brothers? is a 2003 album of Russian-language songs from World War II recorded by baritone Dmitry Hvorostovsky and conductor Constantine Orbelian for Delos Productions. The album was released in Russia as Songs of the War Years (Песни военных лет). It was based on a concert at the Kremlin Palace in Moscow. A video of the concert and 13 of the songs was released on the American VAI label. The repertoire of the concert is the very core of the Russian war song genre and the sound and video releases were accompanied by booklet essays and sung texts and translations.

A follow-up concert on Red Square followed. The next year, 2005, Hvorostovsky took the programme on an official tour through Russia at the personal invitation of President Vladimir Putin. Hvorostovsky's tour repertoire also included songs not released on the CD including by Dmitri Shostakovich.

Track listing
 Gde-to Daleko (Pesnya o Dalekoy Rodine) (Somewhere Far Away)  «Где-то далеко (Песня о далёкой родине)» (music Mikael Tariverdiev — lyrics Robert Rozhdestvensky)
 Dark Is the Night Tiomnaia Noch  «Тёмная ночь» (music Nikita Bogoslovsky — lyrics Vladimir Agatov ru) 
 Slutchaynyy Val's (Unexpected Waltz) «Случайный вальс» (music Mark Fradkin — lyrics Evgeni Dolmatovski)
 Gde zhe vy teper', druz'ya-odnopolchane (Where are you, my brothers?) «Где же вы теперь, друзья-однополчане» (Vasily Solovyov-Sedoi — Aleksei Fatnyanoc ru) 
 Na Bezymiannoy Vysote (On a Nameless Hill) «На безымянной высоте» (song Veniamin Basner — lyrics Mikhail Matusovsky) 
 Dorogi (The Roads) «Дороги» (Anatolii Novikov ru — Lev Oshanin ru)
 Vot Soldaty Idut (Soldiers are Coming) «Вот солдаты идут» (Kirill Molchanov — Mikhail Lvovskii ru) 
 Zhuravli (Cranes) «Журавли» 1968 (Yan Frenkel — Dagestani text Rasul Gamzatov, Russian translation Naum Grebnev ru)
 V Zemlianke (In the Trenches) «В землянке» (Konstantin Listov — Aleksei Surkov ru) 
 Zavetnyy Kamen (The Sacred Stone) «Заветный камень» (Mikhail Matusovsky — Aleksander Zharov ru)
 Katyusha «Катюша» (Matvey Blanter — Mikhail Isakovskii ru) 
 Kazaki v Berline (Cossacks in Berlin) «Казаки в Берлине» (Dmitry Pokrass, Daniil Pokrass ru — Tsezar Solodar ru)
 Moya Moskva (My Moscow) «Моя Москва» (Isaak Dunayevsky — Mark Lisyanskii ru, Sergei Agranian ru) 
 Dorozhka Frontovaia (Pesenka Frontovogo Shofiora) (The Road to the Front) «Дорожка фронтовая (песенка фронтового шофёра)» (Boris Mokroysov ru — Naum Labkovskii ru, Boris Laskin ru)
 On the Hills of Manchuria «На сопках Маньчжурии» (Ilia Shatrov ru — Aleksei Mashistov ru) — 2:55
 Odinokaia Garmon (The Lonely Accordion) «Одинокая гармонь» (Boris Mokroysov ru — Mikhail Isakovskii ru) 
 Posledniy Boi (The Last Battle) «Последний бой» (Mikhail Nozhkin ru)

DVD
Russian Songs from the War Years
 Soldiers Are Coming (K. Molchanov  M. L’vovsky)
 Dark is the Night (N. Bogoslovsky  V. Agatov)
 Unexpected Waltz (M. Fradkin  Ye. Dolmatovsky)
 The Roads (A. Novikov  L. Oshanin)
 On a Nameless Hill (V. Basner  M. Matusovsky)
 Somewhere Far Away (M. Tariverdiev  R. Rozhdestvensky)
 Katyusha (M. Blanter  M. Isakovsky)
 The Hills of Manchuria (I. Shatrov  A. Mashistov)
 The Sacred Stone (M. Matusovsky  A. Zharov)
 The Lonely Accordion (B. Mokrousov  M. Isakovsky)
 Cranes (Ya. Frenkel  R. Gamzatov)
 The Last Battle (M. Nozhkin)
 My Moscow (I. Dunaevsky  M. Lisiansky, S. Agaranian)
Concert Recorded at the State Kremlin Palace, Moscow on April 8, 2003. VAI.

References

Russian-language albums
2003 classical albums
Dmitri Hvorostovsky albums